Kahn-e Bala may refer to:
 Kahn-e Bala, Hormozgan
 Kahn-e Bala, Sistan and Baluchestan